Petalostigma is a genus of plants under the family Picrodendraceae and the monogeneric subtribe Petalostigmatinae, first defined by von Mueller in 1857. It is native to New Guinea and Australia. They are evergreen, dioecious shrubs or trees.

In local medicine, pregnancy is said to be avoided by eating the fruit of the quinine bush (Petalostigma pubescens), which does not actually contains quinine. Another example is Petalostigma triloculare which features exploding fruit.

Species
This is a list of species in the genus as published by the Kew Royal Botanic Gardens.
 Petalostigma banksii - Northern Territory, Queensland
 Petalostigma pachyphyllum - Queensland  
 Petalostigma pubescens - quinine berry, quinine bush, quinine tree - Papua New Guinea, Queensland, Northern Territory, New South Wales, Western Australia 
 Petalostigma quadriloculare - Queensland, Northern Territory, Western Australia 
 Petalostigma triloculare - Queensland

See also
Cinchona - another genus known for containing quinine
Taxonomy of the Picrodendraceae

References

Picrodendraceae
Malpighiales genera
Dioecious plants